Asari Station may refer to:

 Asari Station (Hokkaido), in Otaru, Hokkaido, Japan
 Asari Station (Shimane), in Gōtsu, Shimane Prefecture, Japan
 Asari station (Latvia), in Jūrmala, Latvia